Selfe is a surname. Notable people with the surname include:

 James Selfe (born 1955), South African politician
 Ray Selfe (1837–1873), English lawyer and politician
 Norman Selfe (1839–1911), Australian engineer
 William Lucius Selfe (1845-1924), British judge